José Ulloa (born 1934) is a Spanish film director, screenwriter and actor.

He is known for directing El refugio del miedo (1974), starring Patty Shepard, a science fiction film in which a matrimony exists in a fallout shelter. With Manuel Vázquez Montalbán he penned Tatuaje (1978). He also directed Juventud sin freno (1978), La amante ingenua (1977), Juventud sin freno (1978), and Andalucía chica (1989).

He wrote the screenplay and was the assistant director of Tu fosa será la exacta... amigo (1972).

Filmography

As director

As assistant director

As writer

As actor

References

Bibliography

External links

Film directors from Madrid
Spanish screenwriters
Spanish male film actors
Living people
1934 births